Coming to Africa is a 2020 African-American film directed and written by Anwar Jamison.

Plot 
Adrian, a financial philandering, has spent his entire life chasing corporate success shunning Black consciousness. His brother Buck unlike him is vocal and leads the black community through several engagement in a barbering shop. Adrian had some disappointment and discrimination and later finds himself in Africa, Ghana to be precise. He met a young woman called Akosua who engaged him and changed his perception of Africa.

Cast

References

External links

2020 films
American drama films
2020s American films